Tatiana Yuryevna Logunova (born 3 July 1980 in Moscow) is a Russian épée fencer. She won two gold medals in the team épée event at the 2000 and 2004 Summer Olympics.

References

External links
 
  (archive)
  (archive)
 

1980 births
Living people
Martial artists from Moscow
Russian female épée fencers
Fencers at the 2000 Summer Olympics
Fencers at the 2004 Summer Olympics
Fencers at the 2008 Summer Olympics
Fencers at the 2012 Summer Olympics
Fencers at the 2016 Summer Olympics
Olympic fencers of Russia
Olympic gold medalists for Russia
Olympic bronze medalists for Russia
Olympic medalists in fencing
Medalists at the 2000 Summer Olympics
Medalists at the 2004 Summer Olympics
Medalists at the 2016 Summer Olympics
Universiade medalists in fencing
Universiade bronze medalists for Russia
Medalists at the 1999 Summer Universiade
21st-century Russian women